This is a List of Notable Old Boys of The King's School, Sydney, former students of the Anglican school, The King's School in North Parramatta, Sydney, Australia.

Business

 Hugh Mosman, discovered gold in Charters Towers
 David Droga, Founder & Chairman of Droga5
 Basil Fairfax-Ross - Australian Businessman
 Lionel Lee - Current CEO of Bing Lee

Media, entertainment and the arts
 Bruce Beresford – Film director
 Michael Blakemore AO OBE – Freelance theatre and film director
 Richard Brancatisano - Actor
 David Campbell – Poet
Robert Crawford – Poet
David Campbell - Poet
 John Marsden – Author; founder and principal of Candlebark School
 Andrew Upton – Playwright and screenwriter; husband of Cate Blanchett
 John Farquharson - Journalist
 Charles Mackerras - Conductor

Medicine and science

James Charles Cox – Physician and oncologist
Stephen John James Frank Davies – Adjunct Professor, Division of Science at Murdoch University; Adjunct Professor, School of Environmental Biology at Curtin University of Technology (also attended The Elms School)

James W. Lance – Neurologist; specialist in headache and migraine
Gregory Macalister Mathews CBE – Ornithologist; elected Fellow of the Royal Australasian Ornithologists Union and served as President
Edward Pierson Ramsay – Zoologist; specialist in ornithology
Greg Retallack (senior year 1969) – Professor of Geological Sciences, University of Oregon; specialist in paleopedology and paleobotany.
Thomas Griffith Taylor – Pioneering geographer; physiographer; weather service's official representative on the Terra Nova Expedition; foundation head of Australia's first university geography department (also attended Sydney Grammar School)

Military
Vice Admiral Sir John Gregory Crace KBE, CB – officer of the British Royal Navy (RN); commanded the Australian–United States Support Force (Task Force 44) at the Battle of the Coral Sea
 Lieutenant John Steel ("Jock") Lewes – British Army officer and founding principal training officer of the British Special Air Service; killed in action, 1941.
 Major-General Sir Denzil Macarthur-Onslow CBE, DSO, commander of the 1st Armoured Brigade during World War II.
 Major-General Sir Granville Ryrie KCMG, CB – served in both the Second Boer War and World War I.
 Sydney Christian - Australian Army Colonel
 Jock Lewes - British Army officer

Politics, public service and the law

Sir Joseph Palmer Abbott KB  – Politician and solicitor; Commissioner of the Supreme Court of New South Wales for the district of Maitland; Elected to the New South Wales Legislative Assembly as member for Gunnedah, and later for Wentworth
John Anderson – MHR (Nat); Deputy Prime Minister and Leader of the National Party (1999–2005)
 John Douglas Anthony AC, CH – MHR (Nat) (1957–1984); Deputy Prime Minister (1971–72) and (1975–83); Leader of the National Party (1971–84)
 Mike Baird – Former Premier of NSW
Sir Joshua Peter Bell – Pastoralist and parliamentarian
Sir Nigel Bowen AC KBE – Politician; Member for Parramatta (Liberal); Appointed Attorney-General of Australia in the Second Holt Ministry
Francis Stewart Boyce – Barrister, Supreme Court judge and politician (also attended Sydney Grammar School and Rugby School)
Dr Arthur Chesterfield-Evans – NSW MLC (Dem) (1998–2007)
 Russell Cooper – Premier of Queensland (Sept–Dec 1989); Member of the Queensland Legislative Assembly (Nat)(1983–2001)
Alfred Cox – New Zealand politician.
Somerset de Chair – MP, philanderer and author
Frederick Augustus Forbes – Store-keeper, grazier and politician; Member of the Legislative Assembly of Queensland
William Forster – Politician; Premier of New South Wales (1859–60); Author of poetry and prose
Sir Joseph George Long Innes – Politician, elected to the Legislative Assembly for Mudgee; Queensland District Court judge
Stewart Wolfe Jamieson – Official secretary at the Australian High Commission, Ottawa (1947–50); Officer-in-charge of the information and defence liaison branches, Canberra (1950–52); Consul-general in San Francisco, United States of America; Chargé d'affaires in Dublin; Australia's first high commissioner to Ghana
 Jeremy Kinross – NSW MLA (Lib) (1992–99)
Eric Walwyn Ormsby Martin – Solicitor; mayor of Taree; flying officer in the Royal Air Force
Sir David Maughan – Barrister; President of the Law Council of Australia
 John Frederick McDougall, Member of the Queensland Legislative Council (1860-1895)
 Sandy McPhie – Member of the Queensland Legislative Assembly for Toowoomba North (1983–1989) (Nat)
Robert Darlow Pring – Judge of the Supreme Court of New South Wales
Leon Ashton Punch – Former NSW deputy premier and minister of the crown
Bernard Blomfield Riley – Barrister; Judge of the Federal Court of Bankruptcy; Judge of the Federal Court of Australia
John Randall Sharp – Former National Party member of the Australian House of Representatives representing Gilmore and Hume; Business Executive
 The Hon. Keith Mason QC, former President of the NSW Court of Appeal
 John Anderson - Former Australian Politician
 Horace Berry- Former Australian Politician

Sir Francis Bathurst Suttor – Pastoralist and politician; Elected to the New South Wales Legislative Assembly for Bathurst
Angus Taylor – Australian Shadow Treasurer
 George Thorn – Premier of Queensland (1876–77), Member of the Queensland Legislative Assembly
John Lloyd Waddy, OBE, DFC (1916–1987), a senior officer and aviator in the Royal Australian Air Force (RAAF) who later served as a member of the New South Wales Legislative Assembly and Minister of the Crown.
Sir Charles Gregory Wade KCMG – Premier of New South Wales (1907–1910); Judge (also attended All Saints College, Bathurst)
Bret William Walker SC – Barrister; Member of the NSW Health Clinical Ethics Advisory Panel; Former President of the NSW Bar Association; Former President of the Law Council of Australia
Sir William Charles Windeyer – Politician and judge
John Ewing - Former Australian Politician
John Gunther - Public servant
Hovenden Hely - Australian Explorer and Politican
Jerome Laxale - Federal Member for Bennelong

Religion
Geoffrey Franceys Cranswick – Anglican bishop (also attended Sydney Church of England Grammar School)
William James Gunther – Anglican clergyman
Robert Lethbridge King – Church of England clergyman; Principal of Moore Theological College
George Fairfowl Macarthur – Anglican clergyman and schoolmaster
Percival Stacy Waddy – Anglican clergyman; Cricketer; Headmaster of The King's School
Geoffrey Cranswick - Anglican Bishop
George Cranswick - Bishop

Royalty
 Maha Vajiralongkorn – King of Thailand
 Charles Cavendish - 7th Baron Chesham

Sport

Australian Football
 Ryan Davis (Australian footballer)

Athletics

Nicholas Hough – winner of 110m hurdles 2010 Summer Youth Olympics.

Basketball
Josh Green – NBA player for the Dallas Mavericks

Cricket
Baxter Holt – Current player for Sydney Thunder and New South Wales cricket team
Reg Bettington - Former Australian Cricketer

Soccer

 Travis Cooper – Currently playing for GHFA Spirit FC

Rowing
John Ryrie – Australian men's eight 1912 Olympics
Robert Waley – cox of Australian men's eight 1912 Olympics
Robert Paver – dual Olympian, Australian men's eight 1972 and 1976 Olympics
Samuel Loch – dual Olympian, Australian men's eight 2008 and 2012 Olympics
Matt Ryan – Australian men's four 2008 Olympics (silver medalist) and men's eight 2012 Olympics
 Nick Hudson – Australian quad scull, sliver medallist 2008 World Championships
Cam Girdlestone – Olympic Medalist at 2016 Olympic Games
Andrew Cox - Former Australian Coxswain

Rugby League
 Daniel Conn – Former Rugby League player for the Gold Coast Titans
Joseph Suaalii – Rugby League Player for the Sydney Roosters
Will Penisini – Rugby League Player for the Parramatta Eels

Rugby Union

 Ben Batger – ACT Brumbies
 Will Caldwell – NSW Waratahs
Mitchell Chapman – Queensland Reds, NSW Waratahs and ACT Brumbies
 Tim Davidson – Western Force, NSW Waratahs
 Daniel Halangahu – NSW Waratahs
 Ben Hand – NSW Waratahs
 James Hilgendorf – Western Force
 Julian Huxley – ACT Brumbies, Queensland Reds and Wallabies
 Nicholas Phipps – Melbourne Rebels, New South Wales Waratahs and Wallabies
 Stirling Mortlock – ACT Brumbies and Wallabies
 Dean Mumm – NSW Waratahs and Wallabies
 Benn Robinson – NSW Waratahs and Wallabies
 Jon White – Wallabies (1958-1965).

Shooting
Glenn Kable – Fijian sport shooter, competitor in the 2004, 2008, 2012 and 2016 Olympics in Men's Trap. World Cup winner 2001 Korea..
Reg Roberts - Great Britain (GB) & England Fullbore Rifle Marksman (1989-Present). World Championship GB Team Gold Medallist 2007 & 2015. Captain of GB 2005 & 2016. GB Shooting Hall of Fame 2016.

Tennis

 Rinky Hijikata - Japanese-Australian tennis player, whose career high ATP singles ranking is World No. 217. (2013-2016).

See also
 List of non-government schools in New South Wales
List of boarding schools
Athletic Association of the Great Public Schools of New South Wales

References

External links
The King's School Website
TKS Old Boys Union

Lists of people educated in New South Wales by school affiliation